Raynald of Châtillon (11254 July 1187), also known as Reynald or Reginald, was a knight of French origin who became Prince of Antioch from 1153 to 1160 or 1161 and Lord of Oultrejordain from 1175 until his death. He was born the second son of a French noble family. After losing a part of his patrimony, he joined the Second Crusade in 1147. He settled in the Kingdom of Jerusalem and served in the royal army as a mercenary.

Raynald married Constance, the reigning Princess of Antioch, in 1153, in spite of her subjects' opposition. He was always in need of funds. He captured and tortured Aimery of Limoges, Latin Patriarch of Antioch, because Aimery had refused to pay a subsidy to him.  Raynald launched a plundering raid in Cyprus in 1156, causing great destruction. Four years later, the Byzantine Emperor, Manuel I Komnenos, came to Antioch at the head of a large army, forcing Raynald to beg for his mercy. Raynald made a raid in the valley of the river Euphrates at Marash to seize booty from the local peasants in 1160 or 1161, but he was captured by the governor of Aleppo.

Raynald was held in prison until 1176. After his release for a large ransom, he did not return to Antioch, because his wife had meanwhile died. He married Stephanie of Milly, the wealthy heiress of Oultrejordain. Since Baldwin IV of Jerusalem also granted Hebron to him, Raynald was one of the wealthiest barons of the realm. He controlled the caravan routes between Egypt and Syria. Baldwin, who suffered from leprosy, made him regent in 1177. Raynald led the crusader army that defeated Saladin at the Battle of Montgisard. He was the only Christian leader to pursue an offensive policy against Saladin, making plundering raids against the caravans travelling near his domains. He built a fleet of five ships which plundered the coast of the Red Sea, threatening the route of the Muslim pilgrims towards Mecca in early 1183. Saladin pledged that he would never forgive Raynald.

Raynald was a firm supporter of Baldwin IV's sister, Sybilla, and her husband, Guy of Lusignan, during conflicts regarding the succession of the king. Sibylla and Guy were able to seize the throne in 1186 due to Raynald's co-operation with her uncle, Joscelin III of Courtenay. Raynald attacked a caravan travelling from Egypt to Syria in late 1186 or early 1187, claiming that the truce between Saladin and the Kingdom of Jerusalem did not bind him. After Raynald refused to pay a compensation, Saladin invaded the kingdom and annihilated the crusader army in the Battle of Hattin. Raynald was captured in the battlefield. Saladin personally beheaded him after he refused to convert to Islam. Most historians have regarded Raynald as an irresponsible adventurer whose lust for booty caused the fall of the Kingdom of Jerusalem. On the other hand, Bernard Hamilton says that he was the only crusader leader who tried to prevent Saladin from unifying the nearby Muslim states.

Early years 

Raynald was the younger son of Hervé II, Lord of Donzy. In older historiography, Raynald was described as the son of Geoffrey, Count of Gien, but in 1989 Jean Richard demonstrated Raynald's kinship with the lords of Donzy. They were influential noblemen in the Duchy of Burgundy, claiming the Palladii (a family of Roman senators) as their ancestors.

Raynald was born around 1123. He received Châtillon-sur-Loire, but a part of his patrimony was "violently and unjustly confiscated", according to one of his letters. He came to the Kingdom of Jerusalem before 1153 when he was mentioned as a mercenary fighting in the army of Baldwin III of Jerusalem. According to modern historians, he had joined the crusade of Louis VII of France. Louis departed from France in June 1147. The 12th-century historian William of Tyre, who was Raynald's opponent, claimed that Raynald was "almost a common soldier". LouisVII left the Holy Land for France in the summer of 1149, but Raynald stayed behind in Palestine.

Raymond, Prince of Antioch, and thousands of his soldiers fell in the Battle of Inab on 28June 1148, leaving the principality almost undefended. BaldwinIII of Jerusalem (who was the cousin of Raymond's widow, Constance, the ruling Princess of Antioch) came to Antioch at the head of his army at least three times during the following years. To secure the defence of the principality, Baldwin tried to persuade her to remarry, but she did not accept his candidates. She also refused John Roger, whom the Byzantine Emperor, Manuel I Komnenos, proposed for her husband.

Raynald accompanied Baldwin to Antioch in 1151 and settled in the principality, according to Steven Runciman. It is certain that Raynald fought in Baldwin's army during the siege of Ascalon in early 1153. He may have already been engaged to Constance of Antioch (as Runciman suggests), or their betrothal took place during Raynald's visit to the principality before the end of the siege (as Malcolm Barber proposes). They kept their betrothal a secret until Baldwin gave his permission to their marriage.

Prince of Antioch 

 

After Baldwin granted his consent, Constance married Raynald. He was installed prince in or shortly before May 1153. In that month, he confirmed the privileges of the Venetian merchants. William of Tyre recorded that his subjects were astonished that their "famous, powerful and well-born" princess condescended to "marry a kind of mercenary knight". The wealthy Latin Patriarch of Antioch, Aimery of Limoges, was Raynald's principal opponent. He even refused to pay a subsidy to him. In retaliation, Raynald captured and tortured Aimery, forcing him to sit naked and covered with honey in the sun, before imprisoning him. Aimery was only released on BaldwinIII's demand, but he soon left his see for Jerusalem.

Emperor Manuel sent his envoys to Antioch, proposing to recognize Raynald as the new prince if he launched a campaign against the Armenians of Cilicia, who had risen up against Byzantine rule. Manuel also promised that he would compensate Raynald for the expenses of the campaign. After Raynald defeated the Armenians at Alexandretta in 1155, the Knights Templar seized the region of the Syrian Gates that the Armenians had recently captured. Although the sources are unclear, Runciman and Barber agree that it was Raynald who granted the territory to them.

Always in need of funds, Raynald urged Manuel to send the promised subsidy to him, but Manuel failed to pay the money. Raynald made an alliance with Thoros II of Cilicia. They attacked Cyprus, subjecting the Byzantine island to a three-week orgy of violence in early 1156. They only left Cyprus on the rumour of an imperial fleet approaching the island, but only after they had forced all Cypriots to ransom themselves, with the exception of the wealthiest individuals (including Emperor Manuel's nephew, John Doukas Komnenos), whom they carried off to Antioch. Cyprus would never entirely recover from the devastation that Raynald's and Thoros's marauding raid caused.

Taking advantage of the presence of Thierry, Count of Flanders, and his army in the Holy Land and an earthquake that destroyed most towns of Northern Syria, BaldwinIII of Jerusalem invaded the Muslim territories in the valley of the Orontes River in the autumn of 1157. Raynald joined the royal army, and they laid siege to Shaizar. Shaizar was held by a band of Assassins, but it had been ruled by the Munqidhites who paid an annual tribute to Raynald. Before the capitulation of the garrison, Baldwin decided to grant the fortress to Thierry of Flanders, but Raynald demanded that the count should pay homage to him for the town. After Thierry sharply refused to swear fealty to an upstart, the crusaders abandoned the siege. They marched on Harenc (present-day Harem, Syria), which had been an Antiochene fortress before Nur ad-Din, atabeg of Aleppo, captured it in 1150. After the crusaders captured Harenc in February 1158, Raynald granted it to the Flemish Raynald of Saint-Valery.

Emperor Manuel unexpectedly invaded Cilicia, forcing ThorosII to seek refuge in the mountains in December 1158. Raynald hurried to Mamistra to voluntarily make his submission to the emperor. On Manuel's demand, he and his retainers walked barefoot and bareheaded through the streets of the town to the imperial tent where he prostrated himself, begging for mercy. William of Tyre stated that "the glory of the Latin world was put to shame" on this occasion, because envoys from the nearby Muslim and Christian rulers were also present at Raynald's humiliation. Manuel only forgave him after Raynald agreed to accept a Greek Patriarch in Antioch. Raynald also had to promise that he would allow a Byzantine garrison to stay in the citadel whenever it was required and would send a troop to fight in the Byzantine army. Before long, BaldwinIII of Jerusalem persuaded Manuel to consent to the return of the Latin patriarch, Aimery, to Antioch, instead of installing a Greek patriarch. When the emperor entered Antioch with much pomp and ceremony on 12April 1159, Raynald held the bridle of Manuel's horse. Manuel left the town eight days later.

Raynald made a plundering raid in the valley of the river Euphrates at Marash to seize cattle, horses and camels from the local peasants in November 1160 or 1161. Majd al-Din, governor of Aleppo, attacked Raynald and his retinue on the way back to Antioch. Raynald tried to fight, but the Muslim warriors unhorsed and captured him. He was sent to Aleppo where he was put in jail.

Captivity and release 

Almost nothing is known about Raynald's life while he was kept in jail for fifteen years. He shared his prison with Joscelin III of Courtenay, who had been captured a couple of months before. (Joscelin III was captured in 1164 in the Battle of Harim). In Raynald's absence, Constance wanted to rule alone, but BaldwinIII of Jerusalem made Patriarch Aimery regent for her fifteen-year-old son (Raynald's stepson), Bohemond III of Antioch. Constance died around 1163, shortly after her son reached the age of majority. Her death deprived Raynald of his claim to Antioch. However, he had become an important personality, with prominent family connections. His stepdaughter, Maria of Antioch, married ManuelI Komnenos in 1161. Raynald's own daughter, Agnes, became the wife of Béla III of Hungary.

When Gümüshtekin, governor of Aleppo, one of the last independent Muslim rulers in Syria before Saladin, had conquered almost all neighboring states, he released Raynald, along with Joscelin of Courtenay and all other Christians prisoners in 1176. Raynald's ransom, fixed at 120,000 gold dinars, reflected his prestige. It was most probably paid by ManuelI Komnenos, according to Barber and Bernard Hamilton.

Raynald came to Jerusalem with Joscelin before 1September 1176  where he became a close ally of Joscelin's sister, Agnes of Courtenay. She was the mother of the young Baldwin IV of Jerusalem, who suffered from leprosy. Hugo Etherianis, who lived in Constantinople after around 1165, mentioned in the preface of his About the Procession of the Holy Spirit that he had asked "Prince Raynald" to deliver a copy of the work to Aimery of Limoges. According to historian Bernard Hamilton, these words suggest that Raynald led the embassy that BaldwinIV sent to Constantinople to confirm an alliance between Jerusalem and the Byzantine Empire against Egypt.

Lord of Oultrejordain

First years 

Raynald married Stephanie of Milly, the lady of Oultrejordain, and BaldwinIV also granted him Hebron. The first extant charter styling Raynald as "Lord of Hebron and Montréal" was issued in November 1177. He owed service of 60 knights to the Crown, showing that he had become one of the wealthiest barons of the realm. From his castles at Kerak and Montréal, he controlled the routes between the two main parts of Saladin's empire, Syria and Egypt. Raynald and BaldwinIV's brother-in-law, William of Montferrat, jointly granted large estates to Rodrigo Álvarez, the founder of the Order of Mountjoy, to strengthen the defence of the southern and eastern frontier of the kingdom. After William of Montferrat died in June 1177, the king made Raynald regent.

Baldwin IV's cousin, Philip I, Count of Flanders, came to the Holy Land at the head of a crusader army in early August 1177. The king offered him the regency, but Philip refused the offer, saying that he did not want to stay in the kingdom. Philip declared that he was "willing to take orders" from anybody, but he protested when Baldwin confirmed Raynald's position as "regent of the kingdom and of the armies". Philip left the kingdom a month after his arrival.

Saladin invaded the region of Ascalon, but the royal army launched an attack on him in the Battle of Montgisard on 25November, leading to his defeat. William of Tyre and Ernoul attributed the victory to the king, but Baha ad-Din ibn Shaddad and other Muslim authors recorded that Raynald was the supreme commander. Saladin himself referred to the battle as a "major defeat which God mended with the famous battle of Hattin", according to Baha ad-Din.

Raynald was the first among the witnesses to sign most royal charters between 1177 and 1180, showing that he was the king's most influential official during this period. Raynald became one of the principal supporters of Guy of Lusignan, who married the king's elder sister, Sybilla, in early 1180, although many barons of the realm had opposed the marriage. The king's half sister, Isabella (whose stepfather, Balian of Ibelin was Guy of Lusignan's opponent) was engaged to Raynald's stepson, Humphrey IV of Toron, in autumn 1180. BaldwinIV dispatched Raynald, along with Heraclius, Latin Patriarch of Jerusalem, to mediate a reconciliation between Bohemond III of Antioch and Patriarch Aimery in early 1181. Roupen III, Lord of Cilician Armenia, married Raynald's stepdaughter, Isabella of Toron.

Fights against Saladin  

Raynald was the only Christian leader who fought against Saladin in the 1180s. The contemporaneous Ernoul mentioned two raids that Raynald made against caravans travelling between Egypt and Syria, breaking the truce. Modern historians debate whether Raynald's desire for booty inspired these military actions, or were deliberate maneuvers to prevent Saladin from annexing new territories. Saladin tried to seize Aleppo after As-Salih Ismail al-Malik, the Zengid emir of the town, died on 18November 1181. Raynald stormed into Saladin's territory, reaching as far as Tabuk on the route between Damascus and Mecca in late 1181. Saladin's nephew, Farrukh Shah, invaded Oultrejourdain instead of attacking Aleppo to compel Raynald to return from the Arabian desert. Before long, Raynald seized a caravan and imprisoned its members. On Saladin's protest, BaldwinIV ordered Raynald to free them, but Raynald did not obey him. His defiance annoyed the king, enabling Raymond III of Tripoli's partisans to reconcile him with the monarch. Raymond's return to the royal court put an end to Raynald's paramount position. He accepted the new situation and cooperated with the king and Raymond during the fights against Saladin in summer 1182.

Saladin revived the Egyptian naval force and tried to capture Beirut, but his ships were forced to retreat. Raynald ordered the building of five ships which were carried to the Gulf of Aqaba at the northern end of the Red Sea in February 1183. Raynald laid siege to the Egyptian fortress on Ile de Graye. Part of his fleet made a plundering raid along the coasts, threatening the security of the holy cities of Mecca and Medina. Raynald left Ile de Graye, but his fleet continued the siege. Saladin's brother, Al-Adil, the governor of Egypt, dispatched a fleet to the Red Sea. The Egyptians relieved Ile de Graye and destroyed the Christian fleet. Raynald's soldiers were executed, and Saladin took an oath that he would never forgive him. Though Raynald's naval expedition "showed a remarkable degree of initiative", according to historian Bernard Hamilton, most modern historians agree that it contributed to the unification of Syria and Egypt under Saladin's rule. Saladin captured Aleppo in June 1183, completing the encirclement of the crusader states.

Baldwin IV, who had become seriously ill, made Guy of Lusignan bailli (or regent) in October 1183. Within a month, Baldwin dismissed Guy, and had Guy's five-year-old stepson, Baldwin V, crowned king. Raynald was not present at the child's coronation, because he attended the wedding of his stepson, Humphrey, and BaldwinIV's sister, Isabella, in Kerak. Saladin unexpectedly invaded Oultrejordain, forcing the local inhabitants to seek refuge in Kerak. After Saladin broke into the town, Raynald only managed to escape to the fortress because one of his retainers had hindered the attackers from seizing the bridge between the town and the castle. Saladin laid siege to Kerak. According to Ernoul, Raynald's wife sent dishes from the wedding to Saladin, persuading him to stop bombarding the tower where her son and his wife stayed. After envoys from Kerak informed BaldwinIV of the siege, the royal army left Jerusalem for Kerak under the command of the king and RaymondIII of Tripoli. Saladin abandoned the siege before their arrival on 4December. On Saladin's order, Izz al-Din Usama had a fortress built at Ajloun, near the northern border of Raynald's domains.

Kingmaker  

Baldwin IV died in early 1185. His successor, the child BaldwinV died in late summer 1186. The High Court of Jerusalem had ruled that neither BaldwinV's mother, Sybilla (who was Guy of Lusignan's wife), nor her sister, Isabella (who was the wife of Raynald's stepson), could be crowned without the decision of the pope, the Holy Roman Emperor, and the kings of France and England about BaldwinV's lawful successor. However, Sybilla's uncle, JoscelinIII of Courtenay, took control of Jerusalem with the support of Raynald and other influential prelates and royal officials. Raynald urged the townspeople to accept Sybilla as the lawful monarch, according to the Estoire de Eracles. The bailli, RaymondIII of Tripoli, and his supporters tried to prevent her coronation and reminded her partisans of the decision of the High Court. Ignoring their protest, Raynald and Gerard of Ridefort, Grand Master of the Knights Templar, accompanied Sybilla to the Holy Sepulchre, where she was crowned. She also arranged the coronation of her husband, although he was unpopular even among her supporters. Her opponents tried to persuade Raynald's stepson, Humphrey, to claim the crown on his wife's behalf, but Humphrey deserted them and swore fealty to Sybilla and Guy. Raynald headed the list of secular witnesses in four royal charters issued between 21October 1186 and 7March 1187, showing that he had become a principal figure in the new king's court.

Ali ibn al-Athir and other Muslim historians recorded that Raynald made a truce with Saladin in 1186. This "seems unlikely to be true", according to historian Bernard Hamilton, because the truce between the Kingdom of Jerusalem and Saladin covered Raynald's domains. In late 1186 or early 1187, a rich caravan travelled through Oultrejordain from Egypt to Syria. Ali ibn al-Athir mentioned that a group of armed men accompanied the caravan. Raynald seized the caravan, possibly because he regarded the presence of soldiers as a breach of the truce, according to Hamilton. He took all the merchants and their families prisoner, seized a large amount of booty, and refused to receive envoys from Saladin demanding compensation. Saladin sent his envoys to Guy of Lusignan, who accepted his demands. However, Raynald refused to obey the king, stating that "he was lord of his land, just as Guy was lord of his, and he had no truces with the Saracens". Saladin proclaimed a jihad (or holy war) against the kingdom, taking an oath that he would personally kill Raynald for breaking the truce.

Capture and execution 

The Estoire de Eracles wrongly claimed that Saladin's sister was also among the prisoners taken by Raynald when he seized the caravan. Actually, she returned from Mecca to Damascus in a subsequent pilgrim-caravan in March 1187. To protect her against an attack by Raynald, Saladin escorted the pilgrims while they were travelling near Oultrejordain. Saladin stormed into Oultrejordain on 26April and pillaged Raynald's domains for a month. Thereafter, Saladin marched to Ashtara, where the troops coming from all parts of his realm assembled.

The Christian forces assembled at Sepphoris. Raynald and Gerard of Ridefort persuaded Guy of Lusignan to take the initiative and attack Saladin's army, although RaymondIII of Tripoli had tried to persuade the king to avoid a direct fight with it. During the debate, Raynald accused Raymond of Tripoli of co-operating with the enemy. Saladin inflicted a crushing defeat on the crusaders in the Battle of Hattin on 4July. Most commanders of the Christian army were captured on the battlefield.

Guy of Lusignan and Raynald were among the prisoners who were brought before Saladin. Saladin handed a cup of iced rose water to Guy. After drinking from the cup, the king handed it to Raynald. Imad ad-Din al-Isfahani (who was present) recorded that Raynald drank from the cup. Since customary law prescribed that a man who gave food or drink to a prisoner could not murder him, Saladin stated that it was Guy who had given the cup to Raynald. Saladin called Raynald to his tent. He accused him of many crimes (including brigandage and blasphemy), offering him to choose between conversion to Islam or death, according to Imad ad-Din and Ibn al-Athir. After Raynald flatly refused to convert, Saladin took a sword and struck Raynald with it. As Raynald fell to the ground, Saladin beheaded him. The reliability of the reports of Saladin's offer to Raynald is subject to a scholarly debate, because the Muslim authors who recorded them may have only wanted to improve Saladin's image. Ernoul's chronicle and the Estoire de Eracles recounted the events ending with Raynald's execution in almost the same language as the Muslim authors. However, according to Ernoul's chronicle, Raynald refused to drink from the cup that Guy of Lusignan handed to him. According to Ernoul, Raynald's head was struck off by Saladin's mamluks and it was brought to Damascus to be "dragged along the ground to show the Saracens, whom the prince had wronged, that vengeance had been exacted". Baha ad-Din also wrote that Raynald's fate shocked Guy of Lusignan, but Saladin soon comforted him, stating that "A king does not kill a king, but that man's perfidy and insolence went too far".

Family 

Raynald's first wife, Constance of Antioch (born in 1128), was the only daughter of Bohemond II of Antioch and Alice of Jerusalem. Constance succeeded her father in Antioch in 1130. She was given in marriage to Raymond of Poitiers in 1136. Years after his death, Raynald married the widowed Constance and seized Antioch.

Their daughter, Agnes, moved to Constantinople in early 1170 to marry Kaisar Alexios-Béla, the younger brother of Stephen III of Hungary, who lived in the Byzantine Empire. Agnes was renamed Anna in Constantinople. Her husband succeeded his brother as BélaIII of Hungary in 1172. She followed her husband to Hungary, where she gave birth to seven children before she died around 1184. Raynald and Constance's second daughter, Alice, became the third wife of Azzo VI of Este in 1204. Raynald also had a son, Baldwin, from Constance, according to historian Bernard Hamilton, but Runciman says that Baldwin was Constance's son from her first husband. Baldwin moved to Constantinople in the early 1160s. He died fighting at the head of a Byzantine cavalry regiment in the Battle of Myriokephalon on 17September 1176.

Raynald's second wife, Stephanie of Milly, was the younger daughter of Philip of Milly, Lord of Nablus, and Isabella of Oultrejourdain. She was born around 1145. Her first husband, HumphreyIII of Toron, died around 1173. She inherited Oultrejourdain from her niece, Beatrice Brisbarre, shortly before she married Miles of Plancy in early 1174. Miles of Plancy was murdered in October 1174.

Legacy 

Most information on Raynald's life was recorded by Muslim authors who were hostile to him. Baha ad-Din ibn Shaddad described him as a "monstrous infidel and terrible oppressor" in his biography of Saladin. Saladin compared Raynald with the king of Ethiopia who had tried to destroy Mecca in 570 and was called the "Elephant" in the Surah Fil of the Quran.

Most Christian authors who wrote of Raynald in the 12th and 13th centuries were influenced by Raynald's political opponent, William of Tyre. The author of the Estoire of Eracles stated that Raynald's attack against a caravan at the turn of 1186 and 1187 was the "reason of the loss of the Kingdom of Jerusalem". Modern historians have usually also treated Raynald as a "maverick who did more harm to the Christian than to the [Muslim] cause". Runciman describes him as a marauder who could not resist the temptation presented by the rich caravans passing through Oultrejordain. Runciman argues that Raynald attacked a caravan during the 1180 truce because he "could not understand a policy that ran counter to his wishes". According to Barber, Raynald's behavior during the reign of Guy of Lusignan shows that the kingdom had broken up into "a collection of semi-autonomous fiefdoms" by that time.

Some Christian authors regarded Raynald as a martyr for the faith. Peter of Blois dedicated a book (entitled Passion of Prince Raynald of Antioch) to him shortly after his death. Among modern historians, Bernard Hamilton describes Raynald as "an experienced and responsible crusader leader" who made several attempts to prevent Saladin from uniting the Muslim realms along the borders of the crusader states.

References

Sources

Primary sources 

The Rare and Excellent History of Saladin or al-Nawādir al-Sultaniyya wa'l-Maḥāsin al-Yūsufiyya by Bahā' ad-Dīn Yusuf ibn Rafi ibn Shaddād (Translated by D. S. Richards) (2001). Ashgate. . 
The Chronicle of Ibn Al-Athir for the Crusading Period from Al-Kamil Fi'l-Ta'rikh (Part 2: The Years 541–582/1146–1193: The Age of Nur ad-Din and Saladin) (Translated by D. S. Richards) (2007). Ashgate. .

Secondary sources

Further reading 

 
 
 
 

 
 

1120s births
1187 deaths
12th-century Princes of Antioch
Lords of Oultrejordain
Christians of the Second Crusade
12th-century French people
Medieval French knights
French Roman Catholics
People from Loiret
House of Châtillon